Ugrin Csák may refer to:
 Ugrin Csák, Archbishop of Esztergom (d. 1204)
 Ugrin Csák, Archbishop of Kalocsa (d. 1241)
 Ugrin Csák, Archbishop of Split (d. 1248)
 Ugrin Csák, judge royal and oligarch (d. 1311)